Agapē Agape is a novel by William Gaddis. Published posthumously in 2002 by Viking with an afterword by Joseph Tabbi, Agapē Agape was Gaddis' fifth and final novel. It was published in Great Britain with the contents of The Rush for Second Place as Agapē Agape and Other Writings by Atlantic Books in 2004.

Agapē Agape is written in a paragraphless, monophonic style strongly reminiscent of that of Austrian writer Thomas Bernhard, who is referred to in the book itself.

The first word of the title is the Greek agapē, meaning divine, unconditional love.

External links
Annotations to Agapē Agape at williamgaddis.org
 

2002 American novels
Postmodern novels
American philosophical novels
Novels published posthumously
Novels by William Gaddis
Viking Press books
Novels about music